The men's long jump event at the 2011 Summer Universiade was held on 20–21 August.

Medalists

Results

Qualification
Qualification: 7.85 m (Q) or at least 12 best (q) qualified for the final.

Final

References
Qualification Group A results
Qualification Group B results
Final results

Long
2011